KPVM-LD is a television station based in Pahrump, Nevada, United States, serving the Las Vegas television market. It operates with an independent station format (branded "Prime TV") on its main channel, along with programming from various minor networks on its other digital subchannels. Channel 25 is where KTUD-CD was before it shut down in 2013.

Digital television
KPVM-LD broadcasts several digital subchannels:

In popular culture
The station and its news operation are the subject of the HBO documentary series Small Town News: KPVM Pahrump, which premiered on August 2, 2021.

References

External links
KPVM website

This TV affiliates
PVM-LD
Pahrump, Nevada
Television channels and stations established in 1997
1997 establishments in Nevada